Moses Münz (– 15 August 1831), also known as Maharam Mintz was a Hungarian rabbi. He served as chief rabbi of Alt-Ofen (Óbuda) from 1790 until his death.

Early life and education

Münz was born in Minkowitz around 1750. He studied under Meshullam Egra of Tysmienitz before living for several years in Brody, where he headed a yeshiva and acquired a great reputation as a Talmudical scholar.

Rabbinic career 
At the recommendation of Ezekiel Landau, he was called in 1790 to the chief rabbinate of Alt-Ofen, which had been vacant since the death of Nathan Günsburger in 1781. In 1793 he was appointed chief rabbi of the county of Pest.

Münz's learning spread the reputation of the congregation far beyond the confines of Hungary, and he represented the community at all royal ceremonies. Numerous religious questions were submitted to him from all parts of the Austrian monarchy.

Disputes with other rabbinic leaders

Tefillin 
When in 1794 Mordecai Benet warned against the use of tefillin covered with double leathern straps, Münz charged Benet with ignorance, and argued that the use of such tefillin was legal. He was supported in this contention by Phinehas Hurwitz of Frankfurt, Hirsch Levin of Berlin, and Meshullam Egra of Presburg. Later it became known that the Vilna Gaon had expressed the same opinion. Münz induced Aaron Chorin to write to Benet in defense of this view, but Chorin received no answer.

Book approbation 
When Chorin, in 1803, published his ‘Emek ha-shaveh with a cordial approbation by Moses Münz, Benet denounced it as heretical. Two years later the Arad congregation, after Benet's accusation, asked Münz's opinion upon the book. He declared (8 August 1805) that the author was to blame for certain statements in the first part, entitled Rosh Amanah, which were apt to mislead the public, but reaffirmed that the book contained no heresies. Later on, however, Münz summoned Chorin before a rabbinical tribunal at Alt-Ofen. On the second day of its session (1 September 1805) the former failed to appear, and he did not join in the sentence of condemnation of the book pronounced by his two colleagues.

Jewish soldiers eating legumes during Passover 
As Münz had in 1811 ruled that Jewish soldiers could eat pulse on Pesaḥ, Eliezer Liebermann, author of Or Nogah, considered him a liberal, and applied to him for an endorsement of the Reform temple in Hamburg. Münz did not reply, but he wrote to Chorin an anonymous letter in which he decidedly condemned Reform.

Death from cholera 
Münz died of cholera during the 1826–1837 pandemic.

Publications
 
  Sermon inaugurating the Óbuda Synagogue.
  Collection of 26 responsa, with additions by his son Joseph Isaac Münz.
  Annotations to Peri Ya'aḳov, halakhic novellæ written by Jacob ben Moses.

References
 

1750 births
1831 deaths
19th-century Hungarian Jews
Chief rabbis of cities
Deaths from cholera
Hungarian Orthodox rabbis
People from Óbuda